Ugolino and His Sons may refer to:

 Ugolino and His Sons (Carpeaux)
 Ugolino and His Sons (Rodin)